The 2011–12 Virginia Tech Hokies men's basketball team represented Virginia Polytechnic Institute and State University during the 2011–12 NCAA Division I men's basketball season. The Hokies, led by eighth year head coach Seth Greenberg, played their home games at Cassell Coliseum and are members of the Atlantic Coast Conference. They finished the season 16–17, 4–12 in ACC play to finish in a four way tie for ninth place. They lost in the quarterfinals of the ACC Basketball tournament to Duke.

Roster

Schedule

|-
!colspan=9| Regular season

|-
!colspan=9| ACC men's basketball tournament

References

Virginia Tech Hokies men's basketball seasons
Virginia Tech
Virginia Tech
Virginia Tech